Zoom is a 2016 Sri Lankan Sinhalese horror romantic film directed by Sameera Wackwella and co-produced by Dhammika Abeysena and Praveen Jayaratne for Dil Films International Limited. It stars Sheshadri Priyasad, Hemal Ranasinghe and Dinakshie Priyasad in lead roles along with Jayalath Manoratne and Douglas Ranasinghe. Music composed by Gayan Perera. It is the 1267th Sri Lankan film in the Sinhalese cinema. It is the first 3D film produced in Sri Lanka.

Plot
Two of the main characters are twin sisters Naduli and Sanuli. Naduli and Nisal are in a relationship but suddenly after an unfortunate accident Naduli dies. Sanuli believes that she is to blame for her sister's death as it is due to her mistake that Naduli meets with an untimely death. She suffers mentally. Naduli's soul takes advantage of Sanuli's mental state and takes over her body with the hope of reuniting with Nisal.

The twin's parents, Nisal and a renowned professor try their best to exorcise Naduli's soul out of Sanuli's body. When they believe that they have almost succeeded the story takes an unexpected turn.

Which twin will survive? That is a question that will pop up in the audience's mind as they watch Zoom.

Cast
 Sheshadri Priyasad as Shanuli
 Dinakshie Priyasad as Naduli
 Hemal Ranasinghe as Nisal
 Jayalath Manoratne as Scientist 
 Douglas Ranasinghe as Shanuli and Naduli's father
 Anoja Weerasinghe
 Chamila Peiris as Shanuli and Naduli's mother
 Chaminda Udagedara
 Thushani de Silva

Soundtrack

References

External links
 සම්මානයක් හින්දා යාළුවන්ට පරුෂ වචන වැහි වැහැලා - 2016 හොඳම වේශ නිරූපණ ශිල්පී ප්‍රියංක තිලක් රත්නායක

2016 films
2010s Sinhala-language films